Friday, or, The Other Island is a 1967 novel by French writer Michel Tournier. It retells Daniel Defoe's Robinson Crusoe.

The first edition of the book was published 15 March 1967. It won that year's Grand Prix du roman de l'Académie française. The book ranks 55th on Le Monde's 100 Books of the Century, a list of the one hundred most memorable books of the 20th century, a poll performed during the spring of 1999 by the French retailer Fnac and the Paris newspaper Le Monde.

In 1971, Tournier rewrote the book, adapting it for younger readers, under the title Vendredi ou la Vie sauvage.

Plot 
The young Robinson Crusoe is shipwrecked on a desert island that he names Speranza (Hope). Crusoe tries to civilize and control the nature of the island, but is redeemed by the appearance of an "Araucanian" whom he names Friday. Because of the deep change that happens in Crusoe during the stay, he finally decides not to leave the island, but Friday leaves. In some versions, he leaves the island though.

See also 
Le Monde 100 Books of the Century

References

1967 French novels
Novels by Michel Tournier
French philosophical novels
Parallel literature
Novels set on islands
Castaways in fiction
Robinson Crusoe